Greatest Hits is a compilation album by All-4-One. It was originally released on August 31, 2004 and was not sanctioned by All-4-One or Atlantic/Blitzz Records.

Track listing
 "I Swear"
 "So Much in Love"
 "I Can Love You Like That"
 "Hard Habit to Break"
 "All the Wrong Reasons"
 "It's Who You Are"
 "I Can Love You Like That (Live)
 "I Swear (Live)

Re-release
 "I Swear" - 4:21
 "I Can Love You Like That" - 4:20
 "I Just Wanna Be Your Everything" - 3:55
 "I Prayed For You" - 4:18
 "Like That" - 4:20
 "Some One Who Lives In Your Heart" - 4:27	
 "Here Is My Heart" - 4:46		
 "Men Aren't Supposed To Cry" - 4:04
 "Get It Right" - 4:53		
 "I Don't Know Why" - 3:57
 "One More Day" - 4:31
 "Bridge Over Troubled Waters" - 3:58
 "Quedetha" - 4:17
 "Working On Me" - 4:42
 "2 Sides 2 Every Story" - 4:10

References

All-4-One albums
2004 greatest hits albums